Angul steel plant is the largest steel plant in India and is under expansion. After the expansion, it will become the largest steel plant in the world.

References

Steel plants of India